Lernout may refer to:

 Lernout & Hauspie, Belgian speech recognition technology company
 Brett Lernout (born 1995), Canadian professional ice hockey player
 Greg Lernout (born 1980), Canadian radio broadcaster
 Ward Lernout (born 1931), Belgian painter